The 2019 Pekao Szczecin Open was a professional tennis tournament played on clay courts. It was the 27th edition of the tournament which was part of the 2019 ATP Challenger Tour. It took place in Szczecin, Poland between 9 and 15 September 2019.

Singles main-draw entrants

Seeds

1 Rankings are as of 26 August 2019.

Other entrants
The following players received wildcards into the singles main draw:
  Paweł Ciaś
  Karol Drzewiecki
  Filip Kolasiński
  Daniel Michalski
  Albert Ramos Viñolas

The following player received entry into the singles main draw as an alternate:
  Oscar José Gutierrez

The following players received entry from the qualifying draw:
  Piotr Galus
  Kacper Żuk

The following player received entry as a lucky loser:
  Maciej Smoła

Champions

Singles

 Jozef Kovalík def.  Guido Andreozzi 6–7(5–7), 6–2, 6–4.

Doubles

 Guido Andreozzi /  Andrés Molteni def.  Matwé Middelkoop /  Hans Podlipnik Castillo 6–4, 6–3.

References

2019
2019 ATP Challenger Tour
2019 in Polish tennis
September 2019 sports events in Poland